Year 1081 (MLXXXI) was a  common year starting on Friday (link will display the full calendar) of the Julian calendar.

Events 
 By place 

 Byzantine Empire 
 April 1 – Emperor Nikephoros III is forced to abdicate the throne, and retires to the Peribleptos monastery. He is succeeded by Alexios I Komnenos, who is crowned on April 5, as ruler of the Byzantine Empire. His brother-in-law Nikephoros Melissenos supports Alexios as new emperor, in exchange for the title of Caesar (co-emperor), and is appointed as commander of the Byzantine armies in the West.
 May – A Norman fleet of 150 ships (including 60 horse transports), led by Duke Robert Guiscard, sets off towards the Dalmatian coast. An army of 15,000 men (including about 1,300 Norman knights) sails to the city of Avalona (modern Albania); they are joined by several ships from Ragusa, a republic in the Balkans who are enemies of the Byzantines.
 October 18 – Battle of Dyrrhachium: After taking the island of Corfu, Robert Guiscard advances to Dyrrhachium (modern-day Durrës), and lays siege to the city. Alexios I Komnenos attempts to defend Illyria from the Normans (the first recorded mention of Albania), but is defeated by Guiscard, outside Dyrrhachium, the Byzantine capital city of Illyria.

 Europe 
 King Alfonso VI (the Brave) of Castile exiles his most famous commander, Rodrigo Díaz de Vivar (El Cid), who goes into exile and offers his services to the twins – Counts Ramon Berenguer II and Berenguer Ramon II of Barcelona, but is turned down. He ends up in the service of Emir Yusuf al-Mu'taman ibn Hud of Zaragoza.
 King Mihailo ("King of the Slavs") dies after a 30-year reign. He is succeeded by his son, Constantine Bodin as ruler of Duklja (until 1101).

 Britain 
 Battle of Mynydd Carn (near St. Davids in Wales): Gruffudd ap Cynan in alliance with Rhys ap Tewdwr, prince of Deheubarth, defeats the forces of Trahaearn ap Caradog, Caradog ap Gruffydd and Meilir ap Rhiwallon (who are all killed), allowing Gruffudd to claim the Kingdom of Gwynedd.
 King William I (the Conqueror) orders the creation of a castle at Cardiff during his tour of southern Wales. The first castle on the site would be a motte and bailey type and is built on existing Roman fortifications.

 Seljuk Empire 
 Seljuk emir Tzachas (or Chaka Bey) conquers Smyrna (modern-day İzmir) and founds a short-lived independent state, which emerges as the first sea power in Turkish history.

 By topic 

 Religion 
 Pope Gregory VII writes a letter to Hermann, bishop of Metz, about the behavior of Emperor Henry IV (approximate date).
 Construction begins on St. Canute's Cathedral in Odense (modern Denmark).

Births 
 Louis VI (the Fat), king of France (approximate date)
 Gruffydd ap Rhys, king of Deheubarth (d. 1137)
 Rudolf I, count of Bregenz and Chur (d. 1160)
 Satake Masayoshi, Japanese samurai (d. 1147)
 Suger, French abbot and historian (d. 1151)
 William I, count of  Luxembourg (d. 1131)
 Zhang Bangchang, Chinese prime minister (d. 1127)
 Zhao Mingcheng, Chinese scholar-official (d. 1129)

Deaths 
 September 1 – Eusebius (or Bruno), bishop of Angers
 October 18 
 Konstantios Doukas, Byzantine emperor (b. 1060)
 Nikephoros Palaiologos, Byzantine general
 December 10 – Nikephoros III, Byzantine emperor
 Abelard of Hauteville, Italo-Norman nobleman
 Abu al-Walid al-Baji, Moorish scholar and poet (b. 1013)
 Artau I, count of Pallars Sobirà (approximate date)
 Bernard of Menthon, French priest and saint 
 Bolesław II (the Generous), king of Poland (or 1082)
 Caradog ap Gruffydd, prince of Gwent
 Ibn Hayyus, Syrian poet and panegyrist (b. 1003)
 Jōjin, Japanese Tendai monk and writer (b. 1011)
 Mihailo ("King of the Slavs"), king of Duklja
 Trahaearn ap Caradog, king of Gwynedd (b. 1044)

References